Gaussia  may refer to:
 Gaussia (crustacean), a copepod genus in the family Metridinidae and the order Calanoida
 Gaussia (plant), a palm genus in the family Arecaceae